José David Galván Martínez (born 6 April 1973 in Cuatro Ciénegas, Coahuila) is a Mexican long-distance runner who specializes in the 5000 and 10,000 metres. Nicknamed Keniano Mexicano.

Career
He was the winner of the inaugural North American 5K Championships, helping Mexico to the team title, and his time of 13:47 minutes went unbeaten in the competition's short history.

Family
He is married to Nora Rocha.

International competitions

Personal bests
 1500 metres - 3:39.21 min (2001)
 3000 metres - 7:42.19 min (2000)
 5000 metres - 13:12.18 min (2007)
 10,000 metres - 27:33.96 min (2007)
 Half marathon - 1:03:00 hrs (2001)

References

 
 

Mexican male long-distance runners
Olympic athletes of Mexico
1973 births
Living people
People from Cuatro Ciénegas
Sportspeople from Coahuila
Athletes (track and field) at the 2000 Summer Olympics
Athletes (track and field) at the 2004 Summer Olympics
Athletes (track and field) at the 2008 Summer Olympics
Pan American Games medalists in athletics (track and field)
Pan American Games gold medalists for Mexico
Athletes (track and field) at the 1999 Pan American Games
Athletes (track and field) at the 2003 Pan American Games
Athletes (track and field) at the 2007 Pan American Games
World Athletics Championships athletes for Mexico
Central American and Caribbean Games gold medalists for Mexico
Competitors at the 2002 Central American and Caribbean Games
Competitors at the 2006 Central American and Caribbean Games
Central American and Caribbean Games medalists in athletics
Medalists at the 1999 Pan American Games
20th-century Mexican people
21st-century Mexican people